Karmrashen is a village in the Talin Municipality of the Aragatsotn Province of Armenia. The village is home to the Saint Astvatsatsin Church of 1865, a rock cut shrine, ruins of a fortress, and several khachkars.

History 
In World War I, during the Battle of Sardarabad, Karmrashen (then called Kirmizlu) was a site of military activity. It was passed through by Armenian forces on 27-28 May 1918 to rapidly penetrate into Sogyutlu.

Demographics 
In 2001, Karmrashen had a de jure population of 634, consisting of 308 males and 326 females. However, its de facto population was lower, laying at 582, consisting of 267 males and 315 females.

References 

Populated places in Aragatsotn Province